Tumbaloo Creek is a stream in the U.S. state of Mississippi.

Tumbaloo is a name derived from the Choctaw language meaning "beech tree". A variant name is "Tumpaloo Creek".

References

Rivers of Mississippi
Rivers of Rankin County, Mississippi
Mississippi placenames of Native American origin